Take Me High is a 1973 British feature film, directed by David Askey, written by Christopher Penfold and starring Cliff Richard in his final film role, with Deborah Watling, Hugh Griffith, George Cole and Anthony Andrews.

Set and filmed mainly in Birmingham, it features many landmarks from the city, including Gas Street Basin, Alpha Tower, the Council House (as a hotel), Spaghetti Junction, New Street, Corporation Street, Central Library and the Hall of Memory.

It was released on Warner Home Video in 1988 as a VHS tape. It was not given a retail release on DVD until March 2019, although a free DVD of the film was issued with the Daily Mail on 25 September 2010.

Cast

 Cliff Richard as Tim Matthews
 Deborah Watling (credited as Debbie Watling) as Sarah
 Hugh Griffith as Sir Harry Cunningham
 George Cole as Bert Jackson
 Anthony Andrews as Hugo Flaxman
 Richard Wattis as Sir Charles Furness
 Madeline Smith as Vicki
 Moyra Fraser as Molly

 Ronald Hines as Sam
 Jimmy Gardner as Hulbert
 Noel Trevarthen as Paul 
 Graham Armitage as Boardman 
 John Franklyn-Robbins as Alderman 
 Peter Marshall as Grandson 
 Elizabeth Scott as Waitress 
 Polly Williams as Receptionist

Soundtrack

A soundtrack album was released in December 1973 (which has been released on CD). The title track was a UK top 30 single (No. 27), while the album peaked at No. 41.

Track listing
Side One
"It's Only Money" (Tony Cole)
"Midnight Blue" (Tony Cole)
"Hover” (Instrumental, The David Mackay Orchestra) (Tony Cole)
"Why?" (with Anthony Andrews) (Tony Cole)
"Life" (Tony Cole)
"Driving" (Tony Cole)
"The Game" (Tony Cole)
"Brumburger Duet" (with Debbie Watling) (Tony Cole)

Side Two
"Take Me High" (Tony Cole)
"The Anti-Brotherhood of Man" (Tony Cole)
"Winning" (Tony Cole)
"Driving" (Instrumental, The David Mackay Orchestra) (Tony Cole)
"Join the Band" (Tony Cole)
"The Word is Love" (Tony Cole)
"Brumburger (Finale)" (Tony Cole)

References

External links

 

1973 films
British musical films
Films shot at EMI-Elstree Studios
History of Birmingham, West Midlands
Films set in Birmingham, West Midlands
1970s English-language films
1970s British films